Sylvanus Nimely (born 4 September 1998) is a Liberian professional footballer who plays as a forward for Uzbek side Surkhon Termez. His older brother, Alex, also played football.

Club career
On 23 February 2017, he joined the Russian Premier League side FC Spartak Moscow.

After playing for a year and a half for the second squad FC Spartak-2 Moscow, he made his debut in the Russian Premier League on 29 October 2018 in a game against FC Rubin Kazan.

On 26 January 2021, Spartak announced that Nimely transferred to Croatian side HNK Gorica.

International career
He made his international debut on 7 September 2013, coming on as a 70th-minute substitute for Samuel Thompson in a 4–1 2014 FIFA World Cup qualifying defeat to Angola at the Tundavala National Stadium in Lubango.

References

External links

 

1998 births
Sportspeople from Monrovia
Living people
Liberian footballers
Liberia international footballers
Association football forwards
Monrovia Club Breweries players
MFK Karviná players
FC Spartak-2 Moscow players
FC Spartak Moscow players
HNK Gorica players
FC Ilves players
NK Solin players
Russian First League players
Russian Premier League players
Croatian Football League players
Veikkausliiga players
First Football League (Croatia) players
Liberian expatriate footballers
Expatriate footballers in the Czech Republic
Liberian expatriate sportspeople in the Czech Republic
Expatriate footballers in Russia
Liberian expatriate sportspeople in Russia
Expatriate footballers in Croatia
Liberian expatriate sportspeople in Croatia
Expatriate footballers in Finland
Liberian expatriate sportspeople in Finland